Circus Polka: For a Young Elephant was written by Igor Stravinsky in 1942. He composed it for a ballet production that the choreographer George Balanchine did for Ringling Bros. and Barnum & Bailey Circus. The ballet was performed by fifty elephants and fifty ballerinas. In 1944, Stravinsky published an orchestration of the piece, which is now part of the repertoire of many orchestras.

Composition
Igor Stravinsky and George Balanchine first met in 1925, as Balanchine, who just had started working for Sergei Diaghilev's Ballets Russes, choreographed the ballet version of Stravinsky's Le chant du rossignol. This was the start of a long friendship and many years of collaboration, which continued after both emigrated to the United States in the 1930s.

In late 1941, the Ringling Brothers & Barnum & Bailey Circus made Balanchine the unusual proposal to do the choreography for a ballet involving the circus's famous elephant group in the spring of the following year in New York. Balanchine immediately suggested bringing in Stravinsky, much to the delight of the circus company. However, Stravinsky was only contacted by phone on January 12, 1942. Balanchine would later recount the conversation as follows:

Although Stravinsky was busy with other projects at the time, he negotiated a high fee with the Ringling Brothers & Barnum & Bailey Circus for a short instrumental, which he composed within a few days. The piano version of Circus Polka, subtitled "For a Young Elephant" as an allusion to the phone conversation with Balanchine, was finished on February 5, 1942.

Although the piece is, according to its name, a polka, it does contain a number of changes in rhythm. It only sounds like a polka towards the end, but this part is actually a borrowing from Franz Schubert's Marche Militaire No. 1 in D major, D. 733. Stravinsky always denied that this was a parody of the Marche Militaire. He later called the whole piece a satire, the musical equivalent to Henri de Toulouse-Lautrec's drawings, but his notes do not reflect this.

By the time the ballet was performed, Stravinsky was no longer involved with the project. The arrangement of the piece for an organ and a concert band was done by David Raksin. Balanchine choreographed the Circus Polka for fifty elephants and fifty human dancers, led by the cow elephant Modoc and by Balanchine's wife at the time and principal ballerina Vera Zorina respectively. The elephants, including the bulls, were decked out in pink ballet tutus. Reporters were at first concerned that Stravinsky's music might cause the elephants to panic. Balanchine was eventually able to teach Modoc the choreography.

The show, advertised as a "choreographic Tour de Force", premiered at Madison Square Garden on 9 April 1942. The performance was successful and the crowd was particularly enthusiastic about Balanchine's extraordinary ballet. After this debut, Ringling Brothers performed the ballet another forty-two times, but Stravinsky did not attend any of the shows.

Versions
Two years after he composed the piano version, Stravinsky re-arranged the Circus Polka for an orchestra. This version was premiered along with Four Norwegian Moods by the Boston Symphony Orchestra in January 1944 with Stravinsky as director. During the following months a number of charity concerts to support the U.S. Army fighting in World War II were held and broadcast over the radio. Stravinsky reported that after one such broadcast he received a telegram from an elephant called Bessie who had taken part in the ballet in 1942, and whom he then met in Los Angeles. After listening to another such broadcast, Charles de Gaulle ordered the sheet music for the piece and took it back home to France. The orchestration soon became part of the repertoire of many orchestras and is popular to this day, especially at children's concerts.

George Balanchine re-choreographed the piece for a one-time performance by students from the School of American Ballet, which took place on 5 November 1945 at Carnegie Hall, directed by Lincoln Kirstein. After Jerome Robbins became ballet master at New York City Ballet in 1972, he created a new ballet to Stravinsky's music featuring young dance students and an adult ringmaster for their Stravinsky Festival. Since, it has become a regular piece, often with a guest ringmaster, most notably Mikhail Baryshnikov and most recently with Robert La Fosse.

In 2006, a children's book detailing the history of the Circus Polka, Leda Schubert's Ballet of the Elephants, appeared in the United States.

Notes

Sources

Playbill, New York City Ballet, Tuesday, June 10
Repertory Week, New York City Ballet, Spring season, 2008 repertory, week 7

Reviews 
"Fledgling Dancers, Already Fluent in Two Languages: Balanchine and Robbins" by Alastair Macaulay, The New York Times, June 4, 2008
"Robbins the Contrarian Will Now Bow, Thanks" by Alastair Macaulay, The New York Times, June 12, 2008

External links 
Circus Polka, history, photos
Circus Polka by Georg Predota, interlude.hk, October 18, 2017
, Victor Sangiorgio

Compositions by Igor Stravinsky
1942 compositions
Ballets by Igor Stravinsky
Ballets by George Balanchine
1942 ballet premieres
Ringling Bros. and Barnum & Bailey Circus
Ballets by Jerome Robbins
1972 ballet premieres
New York City Ballet Stravinsky Festival
New York City Ballet repertory